The list of shipwrecks in 1904 includes ships sunk, foundered, grounded, or otherwise lost during 1904.

January

4 January

5 January

7 January

9 January

16 January

18 January

19 January

22 January

23 January

24 January

25 January

26 January

28 January

29 January

30 January

February

1 February

2 February

3 February

6 February

8 February

9 February

11 February

12 February

14 February

21 February

22 February

23 February

24 February

25 February

27 February

28 February

Unknown date

March

2 March

3 March

4 March

6 March

9 March

10 March

11 March

13 March

17 March

18 March

19 March

23 March

25 March

26 March

27 March

31 March

Unknown date

April

8 April

9 April

11 April

12 April

13 April

14 April

16 April

18 April

20 April

23 April

25 April

26 April

28 April

29 April

30 April

Unknown date

May

3 May

12 May

13 May

14 May

15 May

16 May

17 May

18 May

22 May

24 May

25 May

26 May

29 May

30 May

June

3 June

4 June

5 June

11 June

13 June

15 June

16 June

17 June

18 June

20 June

22 June

23 June

26 June

28 June

30 June

July

2 July

4 July

5 July

6 July

10 July

11 July

13 July

15 July

16 July

17 July

20 July

21 July

22 July

24 July

25 July

26 July

28 July

29 July

31 July

Unknown date

August

1 August

2 August

3 August

4 August

5 August

6 August

7 August

8 August

9 August

10 August

11 August

13 August

14 August

16 August

17 August

18 August

19 August

20 August

21 August

22 August

24 August

25 August

28 August

31 August

September

1 September

2 September

3 September

4 September

5 September

9 September

10 September

11 September

14 September

15 September

18 September

22 September

25 September

26 September

29 September

30 September

Unknown date

October

1 October

3 October

4 October

5 October

8 October

10 October

11 October

12 October

13 October

16 October

17 October

22 October

23 October

24 October

25 October

26 October

27 October

28 October

29 October

30 October

November

2 November

4 November

6 November

7 November

10 November

11 November

12 November

13 November

14 November

15 November

16 November

17 November

18 November

19 November

21 November

22 November

23 November

24 November

26 November

28 November

29 November

30 November

Unknown date

December

2 December

3 December

4 December

5 December

6 December

7 December

8 December

9 December

10 December

11 December

12 December

13 December

14 December

15 December

16 December

18 December

19 December

22 December

24 December

25 December

26 December

27 December

Unknown date

Unknown date

References

1904
 
Ship